William Ernest Miles (15 January 1869 – 24 September 1947) was an English surgeon known for the Miles' operation: an abdomino-perineal excision for rectal cancer.

Sources differ as to whether Miles was born in Trinidad or in Uppingham, England. He received his medical education at St Bartholomew's Hospital, from where he graduated in 1891. At age 25, he became a fellow of the Royal College of Surgeons of England. He became interested in rectal cancer under the influence of Harrison Cripps, whose distinguished career at St Bartholomew's was focused on rectal and abdominal surgery.

Formerly, surgery for rectal cancer was by perineal excision, which was less efficient in removing neoplastic tissue but easier to perform and carried less risks for the patient. Miles studied the reasons for recurrence following perineal resection and showed that many cases involved the upwards spread of cancer. His approach was to combine surgery via the perineum with surgery from above the cancer via the abdomen, known as abdomino-perineal resection. Miles perfected this technique over a number of years from 1907, eventually achieving long term remissions and gaining the acceptance of other surgeons. Miles' operation became the gold standard for surgical treatment of rectal cancer.

Bibliography

References

1869 births
1947 deaths
British surgeons